Kelera Nawai (born 14 December 1997) is a Fijian netball player who plays  goal defense or goal keeper. 

She was included in the Fijian squad for the 2019 Netball World Cup, which was also her maiden appearance at a Netball World Cup.

References 

1997 births
Living people
Fijian netball players
2019 Netball World Cup players
Mainland Tactix players
ANZ Premiership players
20th-century Fijian women
21st-century Fijian women
Northern Stars players
Central Pulse players